Ariol is a 1999 comic strip which originated in the French literary magazine J'aime lire. The comic has been collected into seventeen volumes so far, eleven of which have been translated into English by Papercutz. A French-Canadian series of animated shorts of the same title was also produced.

Characters
Ariol, a donkey and the main character
Ramono, a pig who is Ariol's best friend
Mr. Blunt, a dog who teaches Ariol's class
Papi Atole
Petula, a cow who is Ariol's love interest
Mamie Asine
Mamie Annette
Bizbille, a fly who is in love with Ariol
Timberwolf, a cat who is Ariol's rival
Avoine, Ariol's father.
Chevalier Cheval
Mule, Ariol's Mother

Books
Book 1: Just a Donkey Like You and Me, 19 February 2013
Book 2: Thunder Horse, 4 June 2013
Book 3: Happy as a Pig..., 10 December 2013
Book 4: A Beautiful Cow, 6 May 2014
Book 5: Bizzbilla Hits the Bullseye, 12 August 2014
Book 6: A Nasty Cat, 10 February 2015
Book 7: Top Dog, 5 January 2016
Book 8: The Three Donkeys, 26 April 2016
Book 9: The Teeth of the Rabbit, 29 November 2016
Book 10: The Little Rats of the Opera, 27 June 2017

Un-numbered:
Where's Petula?, 26 May 2015

Untranslated:
 Ariol Coffret Jeux Coucoule,  ("Ariol Super Cool Game Kit")
 Le vaccin à réaction,  ("The Vaccination Side Effect")
 La fête à la grenouille ("The Frog Party")
 Le coq sportif ("The Sporty Rooster")
 Le canard calé ("The Clever Duck")
 Ce nigaud d'agneau ("The Silly Lamb")

References

External links
 
Ariol at Papercutz

1999 comics debuts
French comics titles
Comics adapted into animated series
Comics adapted into television series